Dial is a progressive rock band based in the Netherlands.

History
Dial was founded in late 2003 by Liselotte Hegt, Rommert van der Meer and Kristoffer Gildenlöw.
Early on, the band was pure a hobby but after Gildenlöw's departure from Swedish progressive metal band Pain of Salvation in early 2006, the band headed towards a more serious destiny.

In summer 2006, the band went to Austria to record their debut album Synchronized together with producer Devon Graves (of Deadsoul Tribe and  Psychotic Waltz). The album was released in May 2007 through ProgRock Records.

Line-up
Kristoffer Gildenlöw – vocals, basses, electric and acoustic guitars, keyboards, cello, double bass
Liselotte Hegt – vocals, basses, keyboards
Rommert van der Meer – electric and acoustic guitars

External links
Official MySpace page

Swedish progressive metal musical groups
Musical groups established in 2003
Dutch progressive metal musical groups